Harry Hill, later titled The All-New Harry Hill Show and also referred to as The Harry Hill Show, was a British stand-up comedy sketch show, starring comedian Harry Hill, that ran for four series from 1997 to 2003, on both Channel 4 and ITV.

Broadcast

Channel 4 (1997–2000)
The original Channel 4 series of Harry Hill was commissioned on the back of the success of Fruit Fancies, a series of six short comedy films written and performed by Hill, which were broadcast on BBC Two, and a sell-out theatre tour in 1996 which was given excellent reviews by critics and fans alike. The Channel 4 series was commissioned in January 1997. The programme's title, as shown in the title sequence, was simply Harry Hill, but was often referred to, in some programme listings, as The Harry Hill Show.

As well as writing and producing the majority of the show's material himself, the Channel 4 version of the series also featured regular performances from Al Murray, who played Harry's older brother, Alan, Burt Kwouk, who appeared as himself, Steve Bowditch, who played Harry's chief scientist, Finsbury Park, and Matt Bradstock, who played Harry's three year  old adopted son, Alan Hill Jr. Each episode was introduced by Barrie Gosney.

Each episode would also include regular features, such as Burt Kwouk performing "Hey Little Hen", the Badger Parade, Harry reading the news disguised as Zeinab Badawi, and occasionally, a tale from Nana Hill, Harry's eighty two year old nan. The Channel 4 version ran for three years, between 30 May 1997 and 24 April 2000, and spawned three series. The Channel 4 series was produced by Avalon Television.

To tie in with the series, Channel 4 released a book, Harry Hill's Fun Book, for Christmas 1998.

ITV1 (2003)

Following the success of Harry's latest television series, TV Burp, which was broadcast on ITV, ITV decided to recommission the series for themselves, purchasing the rights from Channel 4. For the revival, the show was retitled The All-New Harry Hill Show, and a series of six episodes were broadcast between 9 February and 16 March 2003.

New features for the revival included "The Hamilton Challenge", where each week Neil and Christine Hamilton would take on one of a number of different challenges; "Celebrity hobby that you didn't know about.... but will in a minute".

This was in which Harry would invite a celebrity on, who would then reveal their secret hobby, and the Bouncy Castle, whereby the show would end with the entire audience coming on stage, and bouncing on a giant bouncy castle. Although viewing figures were high enough, ITV decided not to commission a second run, due to fans of the original Channel 4 series expressing distaste for what was dubbed the "poor ITV revival".

Revival (2012)
In June 2012, as part of Channel 4's upcoming Funny Fortnight, Hill revived the series, and filmed a spoof documentary, entitled Whatever Happened to Harry Hill?. The documentary features the story of the original Channel 4 series, and includes interviews with Alan Hill (Al Murray), Burt Kwouk and the Badgers.

The documentary reveals the story in a spoof light, claiming that Hill was in fact the cause of the show's demise, when it was in fact Channel 4's budgetary restraints, and an upcoming deal with ITV which led to its cancellation, fake stories of Hill becoming addicted to Sild and abusing cast members, and a pair of new sketches, dubbed as the "rewritten ending".

This featured Alan Hill performing as Rizzle Kicks and Hill, Alan, Burt Kwouk and Stouffer dressing up as the judges of The Voice UK, to perform a rendition of Jessie J's "Price Tag". The spoof documentary aired on 23 August 2012, alongside repeats of episodes from the first and third series of the show.

Episodes

Series 1 (1997)
 Episode 1 (30 May 1997) – Guests: Keith Harris & Orville
 Episode 2 (6 June 1997) – Guests: Chas & Dave
 Episode 3 (13 June 1997) – Guests: Garry Bushell
 Episode 4 (27 June 1997) – Guests: Billy Bragg
 Episode 5 (4 July 1997) – Guests: Ian Lavender
 Episode 6 (11 July 1997) – Guests: Rustie Lee
 Episode 7 (18 July 1997) – Guests: Peter Davison
 Episode 8 (18 July 1997) – Guests: Todd Carty

Series 2 (1998)
 Episode 1 (30 October 1998) – Guests: Little and Large
 Episode 2 (6 November 1998) – Guests: Jan Leeming
 Episode 3 (13 November 1998) – Guests: Bill Pertwee
 Episode 4 (20 November 1998) – Guests: Mystic Meg
 Episode 5 (27 November 1998) – Guests: Huffty
 Episode 6 (11 December 1998) – Guests: Peter Baldwin
 Episode 7 (18 December 1998) – Guests: The Wurzels
 Episode 8 (18 December 1998) – Guests: Sweep
 Harry Hill's Christmas Sleigh Ride (23 December 1998) – Guests: Acker Bilk and Ted Rogers

Series 3 (2000)
 Harry Hill's Christmas Memory Lane of Laughter (23 December 1999) – Guests: Frank Skinner
 Episode 1 (27 February 2000) – Guests: Phill Jupitus
 Episode 2 (5 March 2000) – Guests: Russ Abbot
 Episode 3 (12 March 2000) – Guests: Ian Lavender
 Episode 4 (19 March 2000) – Guests: Bobby Davro
 Episode 5 (26 March 2000) – Guests: Barbara Dickson
 Episode 6 (9 April 2000) – Guests: Karl Howman
 Episode 7 (16 April 2000) – Guests: David Soul
 Episode 8 (24 April 2000) – Guests: Sarah Greene and Mike Smith

Series 4 (2003)
 Episode 1 (9 February 2003) – Guests: Nigel Havers
 Episode 2 (16 February 2003) – Guests: Gail Porter and Dan Hipgrave
 Episode 3 (23 February 2003) – Guests: Dora Bryan
 Episode 4 (2 March 2003) – Guests: Les Dennis
 Episode 5 (9 March 2003) – Guests: Rick Parfitt
 Episode 6 (16 March 2003) – Guests: Busted

Specials (2012)
 Whatever Happened to Harry Hill? (23 August 2012) – Guests: Paul Burling

External links
 
 
 Harry Hill at BFI
 The All-New Harry Hill Show at BFI

1997 British television series debuts
2003 British television series endings
1990s British comedy television series
2000s British comedy television series
Channel 4 comedy
ITV comedy
Television series by ITV Studios
Harry Hill